Truncatothrips is a genus of thrips in the family Phlaeothripidae.

Species
 Truncatothrips terryae

References

Phlaeothripidae
Thrips
Thrips genera